After 1780, the United States began relations with North African countries and with the Ottoman Empire.

History of relations

American tribute to the Ottoman Empire
On September 5, 1795,  Joseph Donaldson, Junior, appointed by then 1st Minister of US to Portugal David Humphreys, signed a deal with Hassan Bashaw, Dey of Algiers, his Divan and subjects; for the United States to pay indefinitely a yearly tribute of 12,000 Algerine Sequins to the Dey. This amount was equal to USD 21,600 at the time, or, using the price of labor as a conversion metric, equivalent to some twenty million dollars today. The deal also included an upfront payment of $642,500 in silver coin for peace, the release of American captives, various expenses, and gifts for the Dey's royal court and family. The original deal was written in Turkish and constituted a treaty between the autonomous Ottoman vassals of North Africa the Barbary States and the United States of America.

US Barbary Wars
In the early 19th century, the US fought the Barbary Wars against the Barbary states, which were under Ottoman suzerainty. 

In 1825, during the Greek War of Independence and Greek civil wars of 1823-1825, the U.S. Navy conducted anti-piracy operations in the Aegean Sea. Greece and the Aegean were controlled by the Ottomans until Greece achieved independence in 1829. The first draft of the Monroe Doctrine, written in 1823, included a passage praising the Greek revolutionaries, though the passage was ultimately removed.

In 1831 the U.S. sent its first formally approved envoy to the Ottoman Empire, David Porter. The empire and the U.S. at that point had their representatives at the "Envoy Extraordinary and Minister Plenipotentiary" level. Sinan Kuneralp, author of "Ottoman Diplomatic and Consular Personnel in the United States of America, 1867–1917," wrote that the empire initially apparently lacked "any sensible justification" to open a mission stateside due to the relative distance between the countries. Wasti wrote that "there was no real rush on the Ottoman side to send diplomatic envoys to Washington, DC".

The first official Ottoman government visit to the U.S., lasting for six months in 1850, was that of Emin Bey, who toured shipyards there. Two Ottoman officials, one being Edouard Blak Bey, who sensed the rise of the United States, unsuccessfully advocated for installing a mission in the U.S. during the early 1850s. The first Ottoman honorary consulate in the U.S. opened in May 1858. 

In 1866 Ottoman foreign minister Mehmed Emin Âli Pasha declined to start a legation to the U.S. that year, after reviewing a proposal by Ambassador to France of the Ottoman Empire Safvet Pasha. However the ministry changed its mind after the leaders there perceived the reports of the Cretan revolt (1866–1869) from the US consul W.J. Stillman and other American reports to be misleading and decided they needed to present a counter-view. The empire sent its first permanent envoy to the U.S. in 1867, creating the Ottoman Legation in Washington, DC. Since the empire itself began establishing its diplomatic missions in the 1830s and due to the about three decade gap between the respective legations being established, Kuneralp wrote that the Ottomans created their U.S. mission "comparatively late".

Blak was the first envoy to Washington. Kuneralp wrote that the Washington posting was not considered important to the Ottoman government, which is why some officials refused the posting and those considered promising were turned away from it. He cited the cases of then-minister to Florence Rüstem Bey and Osman Nizami Pasha, who declined in 1867 and 1912, respectively.  Nine envoys headed the legation beginning in 1877 and prior to full embassy status, and there were a total of 13 envoys/ambassadors in the position.

Mustafa Shekib Bey, in 1904, recommended that the Ottomans appoint Levantine Armand Guys as the first commercial attaché, arguing that commercial relations had increased.

In 1906 the U.S. upgraded its representation in Constantinople to the embassy level.

The most important aspect of American diplomacy in the late 19th century, down to 1914, involved protection of the hundreds of American Protestant missionaries to the Ottoman Empire.

Armenian issues 
Abdul Hamid II disliked it when the Americans pleaded for help for Armenians. As a result, he terminated the credentials of envoy Mustafa Shekib, and chose not to upgrade the mission to embassy status. Shekib therefore was unable to present his credentials to the President. Shekib slept in the daytime, and so his staff dealt with U.S. officials. Kuneralp stated that therefore "Things were eased out".

Moro rebellion in the Philippines 
In 1899, John Hay, the American Secretary of State, asked the Jewish American ambassador to the Ottoman Empire, Oscar Straus to request Sultan Abdul Hamid II to write a letter to the Moro Sulu Muslims of the Sulu Sultanate in the Philippines telling them to submit to American suzerainty and American military rule (see Philippine–American War). The Sultan obliged and wrote the letter, which was sent to Sulu via Mecca; two Sulu chiefs delivered it to Sulu and it was successful since the "Sulu Mohammedans... refused to join the insurrectionists and had placed themselves under the control of our army, thereby recognizing American sovereignty." 

Abdul Hamid used his position as caliph to order the Sulu Sultan not to resist and not fight the invading Americans. President McKinley did not mention the Ottoman role in the pacification of the Sulu Moros in his address to the first session of the 56th Congress in December 1899 since the agreement with the Sultan of Sulu was not submitted to the Senate until December 18. Despite Sulu's "pan-Islamic" ideology, he readily acceded to Straus' request to avoid hostilities between the West and Muslims. The Sulu sultan was persuaded by the Ottoman Sultan. 

John P. Finley wrote that, "After due consideration of these facts, the Sultan, as Caliph caused a message to be sent to the Mohammedans of the Philippine Islands forbidding them to enter into any hostilities against the Americans, inasmuch as no interference with their religion would be allowed under American rule. As the Moros have never asked more than that, it is not surprising, that they refused all overtures made, by Aguinaldo's agents, at the time of the Filipino insurrection. President McKinley sent a personal letter of thanks to Mr. Straus for the excellent work he had done, and said, its accomplishment had saved the United States at least twenty thousand troops in the field. If the reader will pause to consider what this means in men and also the millions in money, he will appreciate this wonderful piece of diplomacy, in averting a holy war." The Muslim peoples obeyed the order.

In 1904, the Moro Rebellion then broke out between the Americans and Moro Muslims.

Young Turk Revolution 
The Young Turk Revolution removed Abdul Hamid II from power in 1908, and officials more favorable to the U.S. replaced him. The Ottoman Legation in Washington was designated as an embassy in 1909, and given the second class ranking; the Ottoman Empire at the time ranked its embassies by importance.

During the Presidency of William Howard Taft, an American strategy was to become involved in business transactions rather than military confrontations, a policy known as Dollar Diplomacy. It failed with respect to the Ottoman Empire because of opposition from US ambassador Oscar Straus and to Turkish vacillation under pressure from the entrenched European powers who did not wish to see American competition. American trade remained a minor factor.

World War I and the Armenian genocide 
Henry Morgenthau, Sr. was the U.S. Ambassador to the Ottoman Empire during World War I until 1916. Morgenthau criticized the ruling Three Pashas for the Armenian genocide and sought to get help for the Armenians. Jesse B. Jackson, consul in Aleppo, also assisted Armenians. Morgenthau's replacement Abram Isaac Elkus, served in 1916–1917. 

The Ottomans severed diplomatic relations with the United States on April 20, 1917, after the United States had declared war against Germany on April 4, 1917. The United States never declared war on the Ottoman Empire. Normal diplomatic relations were re-established with the Ottoman Empire's successor state, Turkey, in 1927.

Diplomatic missions

U.S. diplomatic missions in the empire included:
 Constantinople (Istanbul) – Legation/Embassy
 It was located in Pera, now known as Beyoğlu.
 Aleppo
 Consul: Jesse B. Jackson
 Beirut
 Brusa (Bursa)
 Harput/Kharpert (now in Elazığ)
 Started from January 1, 1901 with Dr. Thomas H. Norton as the consul; he had no previous experience in international relations, as the U.S. was just recently establishing its diplomatic network. The consulate was established to assist missionaries. The Ottoman Ministry of Internal Security gave him a teskireh travel permit, but the Ottoman Ministry of Foreign Affairs initially refused to recognize the consulate. The building had three stories, a wall, and a garden with mulberry trees. Leslie A. Davis became consul of Harpoot in 1914; Davis stated that this mission was "one of the most remote and inaccessible in the world". Davis observed the Armenian genocide. Davis hid about 80 Armenians in the consulate grounds. His term ended with the cessation of Ottoman-U.S. relations in 1917.
 Jerusalem
 Mersina (Mersin)
 Samsun
 Smyrna (now Izmir)

Ottoman diplomatic missions to the U.S. included:
 Washington, DC (Embassy) – Classified as a "second class embassy".
 New York City (Consulate-General)
 Established after the 1880s to monitor anti-Ottoman activity. New York City, previously served by an honorary consulate, had received increased immigration from the empire. Ottoman envoy Alexandros Mavrogenis had advocated for a full consulate-general and afterwards, on the grounds of New York having more diplomatic importance to the empire than Washington, DC, asked the Ottoman government for a vice consul in New York. The consuls in New York began to squabble for power with the Washington consuls. Kuneralp wrote that the conflict between New York City consul general Refet Bey and his respective Washington envoy, Yusuf Ziya Pasha, "took almost epical dimensions."
 Boston (Consulate-General)
 Established in 1910 so the Ottomans could surveil Armenians in the U.S.

Honorary Ottoman consulates in the U.S.:
 Baltimore
 William Grange served as honorary consul, selected by Blak.
 Boston (later replaced with a consulate-general)
 Joseph Yazidiji, an Ottoman citizen, was an honorary consul.
 Chicago
 New Orleans
 J. O. Nixon was honorary consul, selected by Blak.
 New York City (later replaced with a consulate-general)
 Philadelphia
 San Francisco
 Washington DC/Baltimore (later replaced with a legation/embassy)
 George Porter became the honorary consul for Washington, DC and Baltimore in May 1858.

Ottoman ministers and ambassadors to the U.S.
 Edouard Blak Bey  - 1867-
 Gregory Aristarchis Bey 
 Hüseyin Tevfik Pasha
 Alexandros Mavrogenis Bey
 Mustafa Tahsin Bey – Died of tuberculosis shortly after he began his position
 Ali Ferruh Bey
 Mustafa Shekib Bey
 Mohammed Ali Bey al-Abed a.k.a. Mehmed Ali Bey
 Hüseyin Kazım Bey - Appointed as the first ambassador
 Yusuf Ziya Pasha
 Ahmet Rüstem Bey a.k.a. Alfred de Bilinsky – The final Ottoman Ambassador to the U.S.

The Ottoman government chose to continue the mission with a charge, Hüseyin Avni Bey, after World War I began, and this appointment ended with the cutoff of diplomatic relations on April 20, 1917.

Kuneralp stated that these officials were "interesting figures" but that there was not "a Wellington Koo" among them and "they did not shine in their diplomatic careers", as the Ottoman government did not view this post to be important. He also stated that Madame Bey, wife of first secretary Sıtkı Bey, due to her participation in American social life, was actually the most well-known person in the Ottoman diplomatic community within the US.

American ambassadors to the Ottoman Empire

Chargé d'Affaires:
George W. Erving (pre-1831)
David Porter (September 13, 1831 – May 23, 1840)

Minister Resident:
David Porter (May 23, 1840 – March 3, 1843)
Dabney Smith Carr (February 29, 1844 – October 20, 1849)
George Perkins Marsh (March 11, 1850 – December 19, 1853)
Carroll Spence (February 9, 1854 – December 12, 1857)
James Williams (May 27, 1858 – May 25, 1861)
Edward Joy Morris (October 22, 1861 – October 25, 1870)
Wayne MacVeagh (October 25, 1870 – June 10, 1871)
George H. Boker (March 25, 1872 – May 1, 1875)
Horace Maynard (June 12, 1875 – July 15, 1880)
James Longstreet (December 14, 1880 – April 29, 1881)
Lewis Wallace (September 6, 1881 – September 4, 1882)

Envoy Extraordinary and Minister Plenipotentiary:
Lewis Wallace (September 4, 1882 – May 15, 1885)
Samuel S. Cox (August 25, 1885 – September 14, 1886)
Oscar S. Straus (July 1, 1887 – June 16, 1889)
Solomon Hirsch (December 28, 1889 – June 16, 1892) 
David P. Thompson (January 11, 1893 – May 1, 1893)
Alexander W. Terrell (July 7, 1893 – June 15, 1897)
James Burrill Angell (September 3, 1897 – August 13, 1898)
Oscar S. Straus (October 15, 1898 – December 20, 1899)
John G. A. Leishman (March 29, 1901 – October 5, 1906)

Ambassador Extraordinary and Plenipotentiary:
John G. A. Leishman (October 5, 1906 – June 10, 1909)
Oscar S. Straus (October 4, 1909 – September 3, 1910)
William Woodville Rockhill (August 28, 1911 – November 20, 1913)
Henry Morgenthau, Sr. (December 11, 1913 – February 1, 1916)
Abram I. Elkus (October 2, 1916 – April 20, 1917)

See also
 Foreign relations of the Ottoman Empire
 Foreign relations of the United States

Books about the relations:
 America and the Armenian Genocide of 1915

Relations between the United States and countries once a part of the empire.
 Albania–United States relations
 Bulgaria–United States relations
 Egypt–United States relations
 Greece–United States relations
 Iraq–United States relations
 Israel–United States relations
 Jordan–United States relations
 Lebanon–United States relations
 Libya–United States relations
 North Macedonia–United States relations
 Palestine–United States relations
 Saudi Arabia–United States relations (for the Hejaz region)
 Syria–United States relations
 Turkey–United States relations
 Yemen–United States relations

Notes

Further reading
 Cohen,  Naomi W.  "Ambassador Straus in Turkey, 1909-1910: A Note on Dollar Diplomacy." Mississippi Valley Historical Review 45.4 (1959)  online
 DeNovo, John A. American Interests and Policies in the Middle East, 1900-1939 (1963), pp. 3-26.
 Field, James A. America and the Mediterranean World, 1776-1882 (Princeton, 1969)
 Fisher, Sydney N. "Two Centuries of American Interest in Turkey," in David H. Pinkney and Theodore Ropp, eds., A Festschrift for Frederick B. Artz (Duke UP, 1964), pp. 113–138. online free to borrow
 Gordon, Leland James. American Relations with Turkey, 1830-1930: An Economic Interpretation  (Philadelphia, 1932)
 Kuneralp, Sinan. "Ottoman Diplomatic and Consular Personnel in the United States of America, 1867–1917." In: Criss, Nur Bilge, Selçuk Esenbel, Tony Greenwood, and Louis Mazzari (editors). American Turkish Encounters: Politics and Culture, 1830–1989 (Cambridge Scholars Publishing, 2011). , 9781443832601. pp. 100-108.
 Trask, Roger R. The United States Response to Turkish Nationalism and Reform, 1914-1939 (1971) pp 3–36 on Ottoman years. online

 
United States
Bilateral relations of the United States
Turkey–United States relations